Sultanhanı is a town in Aksaray Province, Turkey. It is named after the famous han (caravanserai) within the town. It is the seat of Sultanhanı District, created in 2017. Its population is 10,958 (2021).

Geography 

History 
Presently, Sultanhanı is not on one of the main highways of Turkey. But it was one of the most important stops in caravan routes during the Middle Ages. The  Seljuk han, which was commissioned by Alaattin Keykubat ('Alā' ad-Dīn Kay Qubād) is considered one of the best preserved hans of the Seljuk period. After the age of discovery, like other caravan routes the Sultanhanı han became neglected.

Another milestone in local history was the Battle of Sultanhanı (also called the Battle of Aksaray) in 1256, where a Mongol army under the command of Baiju defeated the Seljuks.

Economy 
Although the land around Sultanhanı is quite salty, the town economy is flourishing. Main agricultural products are cereal and sugar cane, produced by mechanized agriculture. There is a sugar mill in the town. Another profitable business is ancient rug and carpet restoration. Some people are employed in stock breeding.

See also
 Lake Tuz Natural Gas Storage

References

Populated places in Aksaray Province
Towns in Turkey
Sultanhanı District
Lycaonia